The Bayer designation Psi Draconis (ψ Dra / ψ Draconis) is shared by two star systems, in the constellation Draco:
ψ¹ Draconis
ψ² Draconis

Draconis, Psi
Draco (constellation)